Dub N Bass: Omen II is the second and final studio album by D!v!s!on #9, released in 1997 by Tinman. This was released on New Jersey-based music label Tinman after the bankruptcy of the project's previous label, Fifth Colvmn Records. The track "Omen II" was contributed to the 1998 various artists compilation Empire One, also released by Tinman.

Reception
Sonic Boom  commended the artistic growth shown by D!v!s!on #9 in the compositions and claimed "those changes make the album much easier to listen to outside of a club situation because you can actually enjoy the music without being forced into a crowded dance hall."

Track listing

Personnel 
Adapted from the Dub N Bass: Omen II liner notes.

D!v!s!on #9
 Mick Hale – instruments, production

Production and design
 Alan Douches – mastering
 Zalman Fishman – executive-producer
 Modern Design – design
 Shred – engineering

Release history

References

External links 
 Dub N Bass: Omen II at Discogs (list of releases)

1997 albums
D!v!s!on No. 9 albums